Parathiodina is a monotypic genus of  jumping spiders containing the single species, Parathiodina compta. It was first described by E. B. Bryant in 1943, and is only found on Hispaniola. The name is a combination of the Ancient Greek "para", meaning "alongside", and the salticid genus Thiodina.

References

Fauna of Hispaniola
Monotypic Salticidae genera
Salticidae
Spiders of the Caribbean